Jesse Henry Leavenworth (March 29, 1807–March 12, 1885) was a military officer and engineer.

Biography

Early life
Leavenworth was the son of Brigadier General Henry Leavenworth and his wife Elizabeth Eunice Morrison. He was born March 29, 1807, in Danville, Vermont. He was a graduate of West Point class of 1830.

Early career
Upon graduation he was commissioned as a second lieutenant in the 4th Infantry, known as the "Rocky Mountain Rangers", based near Denver, Colorado, which protected the frontier against bandits and Indian marauders. 

Leavenworth married Elvira Caroline Clark, daughter of Festus Clark, of Sackett's Harbor, New York, June 12, 1832, and they had four sons and four daughters between 1833 and 1853. He resigned from the Army in 1836 to spend more time with his family.

Leavenworth was a civil engineer active in the west, with a private practice based in Chicago, Illinois, for 22 years. He also worked as a lumber merchant in Wisconsin.

Civil War
On February 17, 1862, after the outbreak of the American Civil War, he was commissioned as a colonel in the volunteers and was given command of the 2nd Colorado Infantry Regiment. He was once again assigned to the "Rocky Mountain Rangers" in which he now had the added responsibility of guarding against action by Confederate sympathizers.  He was honorably discharged on September 26, 1863.

Later life
In 1864 the Army made Leavenworth the Indian agent to the Southern Cheyenne, Kiowa and Comanche, representing the United States government in its attempts to keep peace with the tribes. He was responsible for a number of captive releases of hostages taken by the tribes. 

After retiring from government service around 1870, he returned to Wisconsin and resumed his activities as an engineer and merchant; he died in Milwaukee, Wisconsin in 1885. His daughter, Mary, was the wife of Charles James Kershaw, a grain broker trading on the Chicago Board of Trade.

References
Chronicles of Oklahoma: Jesse Henry Leavenworth
"Five Years a Dragoon" by Lowe re Jesse Henry Leavenworth
Encyclopedia of Frontier Biography: Jesse Henry Leavenworth

1807 births
1885 deaths
People from Danville, Vermont
Military personnel from Milwaukee
United States Military Academy alumni
People of Colorado in the American Civil War
Military personnel from Colorado